Cheers, It's Christmas is the first Christmas album and seventh studio album by American country music artist Blake Shelton. It was released on October 2, 2012, through Warner Bros. Nashville. Shelton co-wrote three tracks for the album.

Content
Included on the album is a rendition of Michael Bublé's "Home", done here as a duet with the original artist and featuring Christmas-themed lyrics written by Bublé at Shelton's request. Other collaborators on the album include Shelton's former wife, Miranda Lambert; the supergroup Pistol Annies, which is composed of Lambert, Ashley Monroe, and Angaleena Presley; Shelton's mother, Dorothy Shackleford; Trypta-Phunk, a funk side project founded by Shelton's touring band; Kelly Clarkson; Reba McEntire; and Xenia, who placed fifth on the first season of The Voice, a televised singing competition on which Shelton is a judge.

The Hallmark Channel holiday film, "Time for Me to Come Home for Christmas," which premiered on December 15, 2018 starring Josh Henderson and Megan Park, was inspired by the track Shelton wrote with his mother.

The album was re-released in 2017 with new artwork and three additional tracks: "Savior's Shadow" (from the 2016 album If I'm Honest), "Two Step ’Round the Christmas Tree" and "Christmas Eve" (a version of Gwen Stefani's Christmas Eve).

The album re-released for a second time in 2022 with three additional tracks: "Up on the House Top", "Holly Jolly Christmas" and a cover of "Cheer for the Elves", which originally appeared on the deluxe edition of Gwen Stefani's album, "You Make It Feel Like Christmas".

Commercial performance
In its first week of release, the album sold 9,000 copies in the U.S. The album sold a total of 428,000 copies in the US in 2012, and was certified Gold by the RIAA on November 9, 2012. The album re-entered the charts on November 20, 2013 at number 44 on the Billboard 200, selling 8,000 copies for the week. As of November 2017, the album has sold 688,400 copies in the US.

Track listing

Personnel 
 Blake Shelton – lead vocals
 Charlie Judge – keyboards, acoustic piano
 Gordon Mote – keyboards, acoustic piano
 Bryan Sutton – acoustic guitar
 David Baldwin – electric guitar
 Brent Mason – electric guitar
 Beau Tackett – electric guitar
 Paul Franklin – pedal steel guitar
 Rob Byus – bass 
 Craig Nelson – bass
 Glenn Worf – bass 
 Tracy Broussard – drums, percussion
 Bob Mater – drums, percussion
 Ben Phillips – drums
 Aubrey Haynie – fiddle
 Perry Coleman – backing vocals
 Carolyn Dawn Johnson – backing vocals
 Miranda Lambert – backing vocals, lead and backing vocals on "Jingle Bell Rock"
 Reba McEntire – lead and backing vocals on "Oklahoma Christmas"
 Kelly Clarkson – lead and backing vocals on "There's A New Kid in Town"
 Michael Bublé – lead and backing vocals on "Home"
 Pistol Annies – backing vocals on "Blue Christmas"
 Xenia – lead and backing vocals on "Silver Bells"
 Dorothy Shakleford – backing vocals, lead and backing vocals on "Time for Me to Come Home
 Trypta-Phunk – lead and backing vocals on "The Very Best Time of Year"

Orchestra
 Charlie Judge – arrangements and conductor
 Stephanie O'Keefe – contractor
 Julie Gigante – concertmaster 
Horns and Woodwinds
 Dan Higgins – alto saxophone 
 Joel Peskin – baritone saxophone
 Brian Scanlon – tenor saxophone
 John Mitchell – bassoon
 Gene Cipriano and Phil O'Connor – clarinet
 Dan Higgins and Steve Kujala – flute 
 Earle Dumler – oboe
 Charlie Morillas – bass trombone 
 Nick Lane – trombone
 Chuck Findley – trumpet
 Brian O'Connor, Stephanie O'Keefe, Danielle Ondarza and Brad Warnaar – French horn
Strings
 Paul Cohen, Erika Duke-Kirkpatrick, Steve Erdody, Roger Lebow, Giovanna Moraga-Clayton and George Kim Scholes – cello
 Chuck Berghofer, Geoff Osika, Dave Stone and Mike Valerio– double bass
 Robert Brophy, Caroline Buckmam, Gina Coletti, Darrin McCaan, Eric Rynearson and Mike Whitson – viola
 Armen Anassian, Charlie Bisharat, Jackie Brand, Bruce Dukov, Nina Evtuhov, Julie Gigante, Eric Gorfain, Tamara Hatwan, Amy Hershberger, Maia Jasper, Ana Landauer, Serena McKinney, Cheryl Norman-Blake, Grace Oh, Sid Page, Joel Pargman, Radu Pieptu and Anatoly Rosinsky – violin

Production 
 Scott Hendricks – producer, overdub recording, digital editing 
 Brent Rowan – producer (7)
 Drew Bollman – recording, mix assistant
 Justin Niebank – recording, mixing 
 Nick Spezia – recording assistant 
 Tommy Vicari – horn and orchestra recording 
 Chandler Harrod – horn and orchestra recording assistant 
 Bill Appleby – overdub recording
 Herb Shucher – overdub recording 
 Chris Ashburn – overdub assistant 
 Ben O'Neill – overdub assistant 
 Todd Tidwell – overdub assistant 
 Ben Phillips – digital editing 
 Jeffrey Welch – technical assistant 
 Hank Williams – mastering 
 Scott Johnson – production assistant 
 Katherine Petillo – art direction
 Firecracker Studios – design 
 Kristin Barlowe – photography 

Studios
 Recorded at Ocean Way Nashville (Nashville, Tennessee).
 Overdubs recorded at Starstruck Studios (Nashville, Tennessee); Capitol Studios and EastWest Studios (Hollywood, California); Gas Money Studios; The Villahona Resort; Cinema Sauna.
 Edited at Riverview Back Porch Studios and Superphonic Studio (Nashville, Tennessee).
 Mixed at Blackbird Studio (Nashville, Tennessee) and Hound's Ear Studio (Franklin, Tennessee).
 Technical assistance at Design FX (Los Angeles, California).
 Mastered at MasterMix (Nashville, Tennessee).

Charts and certifications

Weekly charts

Year-end charts

Certifications

References

2012 albums
Blake Shelton albums
Warner Records albums
2012 Christmas albums
Albums produced by Scott Hendricks
Christmas albums by American artists
Country Christmas albums